William Homer Fuller (January 9, 1920 – March 25, 2007) was an American professional basketball player. He played in the National Basketball League for the Oshkosh All-Stars during the 1944–45 season averaged 5.3 points per game. At Texas A&M University–Commerce he played basketball and tennis.

After college, Fuller tried to join the Navy but was denied due to vascular problems in his legs. He became a school teacher in the Dallas, Texas area while also coaching and refereeing high school basketball and football. He moved up the ranks in education to become a Deputy Assistant Superintendent, retiring in 1981. Fuller also refereed collegiately for the Missouri Valley Conference and holds the distinction of being on the officiating crew of the first college football game in the Houston Astrodome.

References

1920 births
2007 deaths
American men's basketball coaches
American men's basketball players
Basketball coaches from Texas
Basketball players from Dallas
College football officials
College men's basketball referees in the United States
College men's tennis players in the United States
Forwards (basketball)
Guards (basketball)
High school basketball coaches in Texas
High school football coaches in Texas
Methodists from Texas
Oshkosh All-Stars players
People from Red River County, Texas
Sportspeople from Dallas
Texas A&M–Commerce Lions men's basketball players
20th-century Methodists